Kingery is a surname. It may refer to:

Persons
Gayle Kingery (born 1939), American politician, teacher
Mike Kingery (born 1961), American baseball player
Paul Kingery, band member of Three Dog Night
Scott Kingery (born 1994), American Major League Baseball player
W. David Kingery (1926–2000), American material scientist
Wayne Kingery (1927–2016), American football halfback and defensive back

Others
Kingery Expressway, formerly called the Tri-State Highway, a freeway in Illinois, USA